The M270 Multiple Launch Rocket System (M270 MLRS) is an American-developed armored, self-propelled, multiple rocket launcher.

The U.S. Army variant of the MLRS vehicle is based on the chassis of the Bradley Fighting Vehicle. The first M270s were delivered in 1983. The MLRS were subsequently adopted by several NATO countries and other countries. The MLRS first saw service with the United States in the 1991 Gulf War. The MLRS has been upgraded to fire guided missiles, and has been used by Ukraine in the 2022 Russian invasion of Ukraine.

Description

Background 
In the early 1970s, the Soviet Union had a clear advantage over U.S. and NATO forces in terms of rocket artillery. Soviet tactics of bombardment by large numbers of truck-mounted multiple rocket launchers (MRLs), such as the BM-21, would saturate a target area with thousands of rockets, ensuring some would hit specific targets while delivering a psychological impact. By contrast, U.S. artillerists favored cannon artillery for its relative accuracy and ammunition conservation over "area fire" rockets, and as a result were left with only a small amount of World War II vintage rocket artillery.

This mindset began to change following the 1973 Yom Kippur War, which saw high loss rates, especially from rear-area weapons like surface-to-air missiles (SAMs), as well as the effective Israeli tactic of hitting such sites with MRLs. This combined with the realization that such an experience would happen on a larger scale in the event of war in Europe. It would be used to engage enemy air defenses and for counterbattery fire, freeing cannon units to provide close support for ground forces.

The MLRS was conceived as the General Support Rocket System (GSRS). In December 1975, the U.S. Army Missile Command issued a request for proposal to industry to assist in determining the best technical approach for the GSRS. In March 1976, the Army awarded contracts to Boeing, Emerson Electric, Martin Marietta, Northrop and Vought to explore the concept definition of the GSRS. In September 1977, Boeing Aerospace and Vought were awarded contracts to develop prototypes of the GSRS. In 1978, the U.S. Army Aviation and Missile Command made changes to the program so that the GSRS could be manufactured in Europe. This was to allow European nations, who had been independently pursuing their own MLRS programs, to buy in to the program. In July 1979, the United States, West Germany, France and the United Kingdom signed a memorandum of understanding for joint development and production of GSRS. In November 1979, GSRS was accordingly redesignated the Multiple Launch Rocket System. Both competitors delivered three MLRS prototypes to the Army. The Army evaluated the MLRS prototypes from December 1979 – February 1980. The Army selected the Vought system in May 1980. Vought began low-rate initial production in early 1982. The first production models were delivered in August 1982. The first units were delivered to the 1st Infantry Division in early 1983. The first operational M270 battery was formed in March 1983, and the first unit was sent to West Germany that September.

European nations produced 287 MLRS systems, with the first being delivered in 1989. Some 1,300 M270 systems have been manufactured in the United States and in Western Europe, along with more than 700,000 rockets.

Overview 
The M270 MLRS weapons system is collectively known as the M270 MLRS Self-Propelled Loader/Launcher (SPLL). The SPLL is composed of three primary subsystems: the M269 Loader Launcher Module (LLM), which also houses the electronic Fire Control System, is mated to the M993 Carrier Vehicle.

The M993 is the designation of the M987 carrier when it is used in the MLRS. The M987/M993 is a lengthened derivative of the Bradley Fighting Vehicle chassis. Originally called the Fighting Vehicle System, the M987 chassis was designed to serve as the basis for many other vehicles. These included the XM1070 Electronic Fighting Vehicle, the M4 Command and Control Vehicle, the Armored Treatment and Transport Vehicle and the Forward Area Armored Logistics System (encompassing three vehicles including the XM1007 AFARV rearm vehicle.

The original GSRS plan called for 210 mm diameter rockets. After European allies became involved with the project, these were replaced with 227 mm rockets in order to accommodate the AT2 mine.

Cold War doctrine for the M270 was for the vehicles to spread out individually and hide until needed, then move to a firing position and launch their rockets, immediately move away to a reloading point, then move to a completely new hiding position near a different firing point. These shoot-and-scoot tactics were planned to avoid susceptibility to Soviet counterbattery fire. One M270 firing 12 M26 rockets would drop 7,728 bomblets, and one MLRS battery of nine launchers firing 108 rockets had the equivalent firepower of 33 battalions of cannon artillery.

The system can fire rockets or MGM-140 ATACMS missiles, which are contained in interchangeable pods. Each pod contains six standard rockets or one guided ATACMS missile; the two types cannot be mixed. The LLM can hold two pods at a time, which are hand-loaded using an integrated winch system. All twelve rockets or two ATACMS missiles can be fired in under a minute. One launcher firing twelve rockets can completely blanket one square kilometer with submunitions. A typical MLRS cluster salvo consisted of three M270 vehicles each firing all 12 rockets. With each rocket containing 644 M77 grenades, the entire salvo would drop 23,184 grenades in the target area. However, with a two percent dud rate, that would leave approximately 400 undetonated bombs scattered over the area, which could endanger friendly troops and civilians.

Production of the M270 ended in 2003, when a last batch was delivered to the Egyptian Army. In 2003, the U.S. Army began low-rate production of the M142 HIMARS. The HIMARS fires all of the munitions of the MLRS, but is based on the chassis of the Family of Medium Tactical Vehicles. As of 2012, BAE Systems still had the capability to restart production of the MLRS.

In 2006, MLRS was upgraded to fire guided rounds. Phase I testing of a guided unitary round (XM31) was completed on an accelerated schedule in March 2006. Due to an Urgent Need Statement, the guided unitary round was quickly fielded and used in action in Iraq. Lockheed Martin also received a contract to convert existing M30 Dual-Purpose Improved Conventional Munition (DPICM) GMLRS rockets to the XM31 unitary variant.

The M31 GMLRS Unitary rocket transformed the M270 into a point target artillery system for the first time. The unitary warhead also made the MLRS able to be used in urban environments. The M31 had a dual-mode fuse with point detonation and delay options to defeat soft targets and lightly fortified bunkers respectively, with the upgraded M31A1 equipped with a multi-mode fuse adding a proximity airburst mode for use against personnel in the open; proximity mode can be set for  Height Of Burst (HOB).

A German developmental artillery system, called the Artillery Gun Module, has used the MLRS chassis on its developmental vehicles.

In 2012, a contract was issued to improve the armor of the M270s and improve the fire control to the standards of the M142 HIMARS. In June 2015, the M270A1 conducted tests of firing rockets after upgrades from the Improved Armored Cab project, which provides the vehicle with an enhanced armored cab and windows.

Service history 

When first deployed with the U.S. Army, the MLRS was used in a composite battalion consisting of two batteries of traditional artillery (howitzers) and one battery of MLRS SPLLs (self-propelled loader/launchers). The first operational Battery was C Battery, 3rd Battalion, 6th Field Artillery, 1st Infantry Division (Ft. Riley, Kansas) in 1982. The first operational organic or "all MLRS" unit was 6th Battalion, 27th Field Artillery.

Originally, a battery consisted of three platoons with three launchers each for nine launchers per battery; by 1987, 25 MLRS batteries were in service. In the 1990s, a battery was reduced to six launchers.

The 6th Battalion, 27th Field Artillery was reactivated as the Army's first Multiple Launch Rocket System (MLRS) battalion in October 1984, and became known as the "Rocket Busters". In March 1990, the unit deployed to White Sands Missile Range, New Mexico to conduct the Initial Operational Test and Evaluation of the Army Tactical Missile System. The success of the test provided the Army with a highly accurate, long range fire support asset.

Gulf War 
The first combat use of the MLRS occurred in the Gulf War. The U.S. deployed over 230 MLRS systems during Operation Desert Storm, and the UK an additional 16.

In September 1990, the 6th Battalion, 27th Field Artillery deployed to Saudi Arabia in support of Operation Desert Shield. Assigned to the XVIII Airborne Corps Artillery, the unit played a critical role in the early defense of Saudi Arabia. As Desert Shield turned into Desert Storm, the Battalion was the first U.S. Field Artillery unit to fire into Iraq. Over the course of the war, the 6th Battalion, 27th Field Artillery provided timely and accurate rocket and missile fires for both U.S. corps in the theater, the 82nd Airborne Division, the 6th French Light Armored Division, the 1st Armored, 1st Infantry Division, the 101st Airborne Division, and the 24th Infantry Division (Mechanized).

A Battery 92nd Field Artillery (MLRS) was deployed to the Gulf War in 1990 from Ft. Hood Texas. 3/27th FA (MLRS) out of Fort Bragg deployed in support of Operation Desert Shield in August 1990. A/21st Field Artillery (MLRS) – 1st Cavalry Division Artillery deployed in support of Operation Desert Shield in September 1990. In December 1990, A-40th Field Artillery (MLRS) – 3rd Armored Division Artillery (Hanau), 1/27th FA (MLRS) part of the 41st Field Artillery Brigade (Babenhausen) and 4/27th FA (MLRS) (Wertheim) deployed in support of Operation Desert Shield from their bases in Germany and 1/158th Field Artillery from the Oklahoma Army National Guard deployed in January 1991.

MLRS launchers were deployed during Operation Desert Storm. Its first use was on 18 January 1991, when Battery A of the 6th Battalion, 27th Field Artillery fired eight ATACMS missiles at Iraqi SAM sites. In one engagement, three MLRS batteries fired 287 rockets at 24 separate targets in less than five minutes, an amount that would have taken a cannon battalion over an hour to fire. In early February 1991, 4-27 FA launched the biggest MLRS night fire mission in history, firing 312 rockets in a single mission. When ground operations began on 24 February 1991, 414 rockets were fired as the U.S. VII Corps advanced. Out of the 57,000 artillery rounds fired by the end of the war, 6,000 were MLRS rockets plus 32 ATACMS.

Middle East 
The MLRS has since been used in numerous military engagements, including the 2003 invasion of Iraq. In March 2007, the British Ministry of Defence decided to send a troop of MLRS to support ongoing operations in Afghanistan's southern province of Helmand; they would use newly developed guided munitions.

In April 2011, the first modernized MLRS II and M31 GMLRS rocket were handed over to the German Army's Artillery School in Idar Oberstein.

Ukraine 

During the 2022 Russian invasion of Ukraine, the United States considered sending the MLRS as part of military aid to Ukraine. Concerns were raised that this system could be used to hit targets inside Russia. US President Joe Biden initially declined to send it to Ukraine, but on May 31 he announced that the M142 HIMARS, another vehicle capable of firing GMLRS rockets, would be supplied.

On 7 June 2022, British defence secretary Ben Wallace announced that the UK would send three (later increased to six) MLRS to aid Ukrainian forces. On 15 June, Germany announced it would send three of its MARS vehicles from German Army stocks.
Ukraine announced they had received the first M270s on 15 July. The German defence secretary Christine Lambrecht announced the arrival of the vehicles they contributed on 26 July 2022, and on 15 September Lambrecht announced that Germany would transfer two more.

Variants 

 M270 is the original version, which carries a weapon load of 12 rockets in two six-pack pods. This armored, tracked mobile launcher uses a stretched Bradley chassis and has a high cross-country capability.
 M270A1 was the result of a 2005 upgrade program for the U.S. Army, and later on for several other states. The launcher appears identical to M270, but incorporates the Improved Fire Control System (IFCS) and an improved launcher mechanical system (ILMS). This allows for significantly faster launch procedures and the firing of GMLRS rockets with GPS-aided guidance. The US Army updated 225 M270 to this standard. When Bahrain ordered an upgrade of nine to "A1 minimum configuration" in 2022, it was stated to include CFCS.
 M270B1 British Army variant of the M270A1, which includes an enhanced armor package to give the crew better protection against IED attacks. Following an agreement struck with the United States Department of Defense, the British Army will be embarking on a five-year programme to update the M270B1 to the M270A2 standard. They are developing some UK-specific systems, including Composite Rubber Tracks (CRT), and a vehicle camera and radar system. Upgrade of the first tranche of launchers started in March 2022, with the fleet going through production over a four-year period. A new Fire Control System will be developed collaboratively with the US, the UK, Italy, and Finland.
 M270C1 was an upgrade proposal from Lockheed Martin involving the M142's Universal Fire Control System (UFCS) instead of IFCS.
 M270D1 Finnish Army variant of the M270A1 that uses the M142's Universal Fire Control System (UFCS).
 MARS II / LRU / MLRS-I is a European variant of the M270A1 involving Germany, France, and Italy.  The launchers are equipped with the European Fire Control System (EFCS) designed by Airbus Defense and Space. The EFCS disables the firing of submunitions-carrying rockets to ensure full compliance with the Convention on Cluster Munitions.
 M270A2 is a 2019 upgrade program to the US Army variant, which includes the new Common Fire Control System (CFCS) to allow the use of the Precision Strike Missile (PrSM). The update also includes a new 600 hp engine, upgraded and rebuilt transmission, and improved cabin armor protection. The U.S. Army will eventually upgrade its entire fleet of 225 M270A1 and an additional 160 decommissioned M270A0 launchers.

Rockets and missiles 

The M270 system can fire MLRS Family Of Munition (MFOM) rockets and artillery missiles, which are manufactured and used by a number of platforms and countries. These include:

MLRS 
M26 and M28 rocket production began in 1980. Until 2005 they were the only rockets available for the M270 system. When production of the M26 series ceased in 2001 a total of 506,718 rockets had been produced. Each rocket pod contains 6 identical rockets. M26 rockets and its derivatives were removed from the US Army's active inventory in June 2009, due to their submunitions not satisfying a July 2008 Department of Defense policy directive on cluster munitions issued under President George W. Bush that US cluster munitions that result in a rate of more than a 1% of unexploded ordnance must be destroyed by the end of 2018. (The United States is not a party to the Convention on Cluster Munitions which prohibits them). In November 2017, the Trump administration replaced the July 2008 policy directive on cluster munitions with a new policy directive, which abandoned the requirement to destroy cluster munitions by the end of 2018 and gave Unified Combatant Command commanders the authority to approve employing cluster munitions. The last use of M26 rockets occurred during Operation Iraqi Freedom in 2003.

 M26 rockets carrying 644 DPICM M77 submunitions. Range: . The submunitions in each rocket cover an area of 0.23 km. Dubbed "Steel Rain" by Iraqi soldiers, M26 rockets were used extensively during Desert Storm and Operation Iraqi Freedom. Initially fielded in 1983, the rockets have a shelf life of 25 years. M26 rockets were removed from the US Army's active inventory in June 2009 and the remaining rockets were being destroyed as of 2009, Italy destroyed its stock of 3,894 M26 rockets by 31 October 2015. but the US requirement was removed in 2017. The UK and the Netherlands destroyed their stock of 60,000 M26 rockets by 2013, while France destroyed its stock of 22,000 M26 rockets by 2017. Germany destroyed its stock of 26,000 M26 rockets by 25 November 2015. The US commenced the destruction of its M26 stocks in 2007, when the US Army requested $109 million for the destruction of 98,904 M26 MLRS rockets from fiscal year 2007 to fiscal year 2012.
 M26A1 ER rockets carrying 518 M85 submunitions. Range: . The M85 submunitions are identical to the M77 submunitions, with the exception of the fuze. The M85 use the M235 mechanical/electronic self-destruct fuze to reduce hazardous duds and the potential for fratricide or collateral damage.
 M26A2 ER rockets carrying 518 M77 submunitions. Interim solution until the M26A1 ER entered service. Range: . The M26A2 ER rockets have been retired from US Army service and the remaining rockets are being destroyed.
 M28 practice rockets. A M26 variant with three ballast containers and three smoke marking containers in place of the submunition payload. Production ceased in favor of the M28A1.
 M28A1 Reduced Range Practice Rocket (RRPR) with blunt nose. Production ceased in favor of the M28A2.
 M28A2 Low Cost Reduced Range Practice Rocket (LCRRPR) with blunt nose.
 AT2 German M26 variant carrying 28 AT2 anti-tank mines. Range:

GMLRS 
Guided Multiple Launch Rocket System (GMLRS) rockets have an extended range and add GPS-aided guidance to their inertial navigation system. Flight control is accomplished by four forward-mounted canards driven by electromechanical actuators. GMLRS rockets were introduced in 2005 and can be fired from the M270A1 and M270A2, the European M270A1 variants (British Army M270B1, German Army MARS II, French Army Lance Roquette Unitaire (LRU), Italian Army MLRS Improved (MLRS-I), Finnish Army M270D1), and the lighter M142 HIMARS launcher. 

The M30 and M31 rockets are, except for their warheads, identical. By December 2021, 50,000 GMLRS rockets had been produced, with yearly production then exceeding 9,000 rockets. Each rocket pod contains 6 identical rockets.

 M30 rockets carrying 404 DPICM M101 submunitions. Range: . 3,936 produced between 2004 and 2009, production ceased in favor of the M30A1. The remaining M30 rockets has been converted at US Army to M31 (Unitary warhead) variant.
 M30A1 rockets with Alternative Warhead (AW). Range: . GMLRS rocket that replaces the M30's submunitions with approximately 182,000 pre-formed tungsten fragments for area effects without unexploded ordnance. Entered production in 2015.
 M30A2 rockets with Alternative Warhead (AW). Range: . Improved M30A1 with Insensitive Munition Propulsion System (IMPS). Only M30 variant in production since 2019.
Range: . Entered production in 2005. The warhead is produced by General Dynamics and contains 51 pounds of PBX-109 high explosive in a steel blast-fragmentation case.
Range: . Improved M31 with new multi-mode fuze that added airburst to the M31's fuze point detonation and delay.
Range: . Improved M31A1 with Insensitive Munition Propulsion System (IMPS). Only M31 variant in production since 2019.
 M32 SMArt German GMLRS variant produced by Diehl Defence carrying 4 SMArt anti-tank submunitions and a new flight software. Developed for MARS II but has not been ordered yet and therefore not in service as of 2019.
Rockets use a slightly increased rocket motor size, a newly designed hull, and tail-driven guidance, while still containing six per pod. It will come in unitary and AW variants. The first successful test flight of a ER GMLRS occurred in March 2021. In early 2021, Lockheed Martin anticipated putting the ER into its production line in the fiscal year 2023 contract award and was planning to produce the new rockets at its Camden facility. In 2022 Finland became the first foreign customer to order ER GMLRS.

GLSDB 
The Ground Launched Small Diameter Bomb (GLSDB) is a weapon made by Boeing and the Saab Group, who modified Boeing's GBU-39 Small Diameter Bomb (SDB) with the addition of a rocket motor.

ATACMS 

Each rocket pod contains one ATACMS missile. As of 2022 only the M48, M57, and M57E1 remain in the US military's active inventory.

 M39 (ATACMS BLOCK I) missile with inertial guidance. The missile carries 950 M74 Anti-personnel and Anti‑materiel (APAM) bomblets. Range: . 1,650 M39 were produced between 1990 and 1997, when production ceased in favor of the M39A1. During Desert Storm 32 M39 were fired at Iraqi targets and during Operation Iraqi Freedom a further 379 M39 were fired. The remaining M39 missiles are being updated since 2017 to M57E1 missiles. The M39 is the only ATACMS variant which can be fired by all M270 and M142 variants.
 M39A1 (ATACMS BLOCK IA) missile with GPS-aided guidance. The missile carries 300 M74 Anti-personnel and Anti‑materiel (APAM) bomblets. Range: . 610 M39A1 were produced between 1997 and 2003. During Operation Iraqi Freedom 74 M39A1 were fired at Iraqi targets. The remaining M39A1 missiles are being updated since 2017 to M57E1 missiles. The M39A1 and all subsequently introduced ATACMS missiles can only be used with the M270A1 (or variants thereof) and the M142.
 M48 (ATACMS Quick Reaction Unitary (QRU) missile with GPS-aided guidance. The missile carries the  WDU-18/B penetrating high explosive blast fragmentation warhead of the US Navy's Harpoon anti-ship missile. Range: . 176 M48 were produced between 2001 and 2004, when production ceased in favor of the M57. During Operation Iraqi Freedom 16 M48 were fired at Iraqi targets a further 42 M48 were fired during Operation Enduring Freedom. The remaining M48 missiles remain in the US Army and US Marine Corps' arsenal.
 M57 (ATACMS TACMS 2000) missile with GPS-aided guidance. The missile carries the same WDU-18/B warhead as the M48. Range: . 513 M57 were produced between 2004 and 2013.
 M57E1 (ATACMS Modification (MOD) missile with GPS-aided guidance. The M57E1 is the designation for upgraded M39 and M39A1 with re-grained motor, updated navigation and guidance software and hardware, and a WDU-18/B unitary warhead instead of the M74 APAM bomblets. The M57E1 ATACMS MOD also includes a proximity sensor for airburst detonation. Production commenced in 2017 with an initial order for 220 upgraded M57E1. The program is slated to end in 2024 with the introduction of the Precision Strike Missile (PrSM), which will replace the ATACMS missiles in the US arsenal.

PrSM 

The Precision Strike Missile (PrSM) is a new series of GPS-guided missiles, which will begin to replace ATACMS missiles from 2024. PrSM missiles can be launched from the M270A2 and the M142, with rockets pods containing 2 missiles. As of 2022 the PrSM is in low rate initial production with 110 missiles being delivered to the US military over the year. PrSM will enter operational service in 2023.

Reverse engineering 
Turkey, in order to obtain M26 supplies without the agreement of the U.S. and because the U.S. was reluctant to share technologies, started reverse-engineering M26 rockets under the SAGE 227 project in order to have its own supply of rockets. During the SAGE-227 project A/B/C/D medium-range composite-fuel artillery rocket and SAGE-227 F experimental guided rocket were developed.

  PARS SAGE-227 F (Turkey): Experimental Guided MLRS (GMLRS) developed by TUBITAK-SAGE to replace the M26 rockets.

Israeli rockets 
Israel developed its own rockets to be used in the "Menatetz", an upgraded version of the M270 MLRS. The rockets are developed and manufactured by IMI Systems.

 Trajectory Corrected Rocket (TCS/RAMAM): In-flight trajectory corrected for enhanced accuracy.
 Romach: GPS-guided rocket with  range,  warhead, and accuracy of less than 10 meters.
 Ra'am Eithan ("Strong Thunder"): an improved version of the TCS/RAMAM (in-flight trajectory corrected for enhanced accuracy) with significantly decreased percentage of duds.

Alternative Warhead Program 
In April 2012, Lockheed Martin received a $79.4 million contract to develop a GMLRS incorporating an Alliant Techsystems-designed alternative warhead to replace DPICM cluster warheads. The AW version is designed as a drop-in replacement with little modification needed to existing rockets. An Engineering and Manufacturing Development (EMD) program was to last 36 months, with the alternative warhead GMLRS expected to enter service in late 2016. The AW warhead is a large airburst fragmentation warhead that explodes  over a target area to disperse penetrating projectiles. Considerable damage is caused to a large area while leaving behind only solid metal penetrators and inert rocket fragments from a  warhead containing approximately 182,000 preformed tungsten fragments. The unitary GMLRS also has an airburst option, but while it produces a large blast and pieces of shrapnel, the AW round's small pellets cover a larger area.

On 22 May 2013, Lockheed and ATK test fired a GMLRS rocket with a new cluster munition warhead developed under the Alternative Warhead Program (AWP), aimed at producing a drop-in replacement for DPICM bomblets in M30 guided rockets. It was fired by an M142 HIMARS and traveled  before detonating. The AWP warhead will have equal or greater effect against materiel and personnel targets, while leaving no unexploded ordnance behind.

In October 2013, Lockheed conducted the third and final engineering development test flight of the GMLRS alternative warhead. The Alternative Warhead Program then moved to production qualification testing.

In July 2014, Lockheed successfully completed all Developmental Test/Operational Test (DT/OT) flight tests for the AW GMLRS. They were the first tests conducted with soldiers operating the fire control system, firing rockets at mid and long-range from a HIMARS. The Initial Operational Test and Evaluation (IOT&E) exercise was to be conducted in fall 2014.

In September 2015, Lockheed received a contract for Lot 10 production of the GMLRS unitary rocket, which includes the first order for AW production.

Specifications 

 Entered service: 1982 (U.S. Army)
 First used in action: 1991 (First Gulf War)
 Crew: 3
 Weight loaded: 
 Length: 
 Width: 
 Height (stowed): 2.57 m (8 ft 5 in)
 Height (max. elevation): not available
 Max. road speed: 
 Cruise range: 
 Reload time: 4 min (M270) 3 min (M270A1)
 Engine: Turbo-charged V8 Cummins VTA903 diesel 500 hp ver2.
 Cross-drive turbo transmission, fully electronically controlled
 Average unit cost: $2.3 million per one launcher (FY 1990), $168,000 per one M31 GMLRS (FY 2023)

Operators

Current operators

M270 
 : Egyptian Army (42)
 : Hellenic Army (36) ATACMS operational.
 : Japan Ground Self-Defense Force (99).
 : Saudi Arabian Army (180)
 : Turkish Army (12) ATACMS BLK 1A operational.

M270A1 
 : Royal Bahraini Army (9) ATACMS operational.
 : Finnish Army (40), M270D1 called 298 RsRakH 06. 22 M270 were bought from the Netherlands in 2006 and upgraded to M270D1 in 2011. The M270D1 use the M142's Universal Fire Control System instead of the standard M270A1 Improved Fire Control System. A further 6 refurbished M270D1 were obtained from the US in 2014. The remaining 12 former Danish M270 are used for driver training only.
 : French Army (13), European M270A1 variant called .
 : German Army (114 M270 stored, 40 MARS II), European M270A1 variant called 
 : Israeli Ground Forces (64), called "Menatetz" מנתץ, "Smasher"
 : Italian Army (22), European M270A1 variant called MLRS Improved (MLRS-I).
 : Republic of Korea Army (58) 48 M270s and 10 M270A1s. ATACMS operational.
 : British Army (44), M270A1 variant called M270B1, which includes an enhanced armor package. The UK intends to double its fleet in the coming years.
 : The United Kingdom, Norway, France, Germany and Italy provided more than ten systems to Ukraine in 2022.

M270A2 
 : United States Army (840+151), 225 M270A1 and 160 M270A2 being delivered. The first M270A2 launcher was delivered 9 July 2022. GMLRS and ATACMS operational.

Former operators

M270 
 : Royal Danish Army (12); sold to Finland
 : Royal Netherlands Army (23); retired from service in 2004; 22 sold to Finland in 2006, 1 displayed in a museum
 : Norwegian Army (12), put in storage in 2005. Three donated to the United Kingdom to support the corresponding transfer of three British M270B1 MLRS to Ukraine.
 : United States Marine Corps replaced by M142 HIMARS

See also 
 M142 HIMARS, which utilize the same pod as MLRS does
 K239 Chunmoo, same ammo pod as M270, Korea version
 T-122 Sakarya
 Fajr-5
 LAR-160
 Astros II MLRS
 Pinaka multi-barrel rocket launcher
 Fath-360
 BM-30 Smerch

References

Sources

External links 

 British MLRS
 Designation Systems
 Diehl BGT—German developer and manufacturer of GMLRS (site in English)
 Danish M270 MLRS

Self-propelled artillery of the United States
Tracked self-propelled rocket launchers
Salvo weapons
Multiple rocket launchers of the United States
Modular rocket launchers
Cluster munition
Military vehicles introduced in the 1980s